The Musée Albert-Kahn is a departmental museum in Boulogne-Billancourt, France, at 14, rue du Port, including four hectares of gardens, joining landscape scenes of various national traditions. The museum includes historical photographs and films collected by the banker and philanthropist Albert Kahn.
Since September 2014, construction works are committed for the extension and the refurbishment of the museum supervised by the architect Kengo Kuma with the cooperation of Ducks Scéno for the construction of another gallery of the exhibition and the renovation of the existing buildings, allowing access to the public in a permanent route.

See also 
 List of museums in France

References

External links 
 Official website

Museums in Hauts-de-Seine
Musee Albert-Kahn
Biographical museums in France
Photography museums and galleries in France
History museums in France